The men's ice hockey tournament at the 1928 Winter Olympics in St. Moritz, Switzerland, was the third Olympic Championship, also serving as the third World Championships and the 13th European Championships. Canada, represented by the University of Toronto Graduates, won its third consecutive gold medal.  Highest finishing European team Sweden won the silver medal and its third European Championship.

Conn Smythe coached the Graduates to the 1927 Allan Cup championship during the Ontario Hockey Association season, but refused to go to the Olympics due to disagreements on which players were added to the team by the Canadian Olympic Committee. The Graduates went without Smythe, led by team captain Red Porter. Canadian Olympic Committee member W. A. Hewitt was opposed to the format of the hockey tournament, which saw the Canadian team receive a bye into the second round. He wanted the team to have more games, rather than be idle for a week. Despite the wait to play, the Graduates won all three games by scoring 38 goals and conceding none, to win the gold medal.

Medalists

Participating nations

A total of 128(*) ice hockey players from eleven nations competed at the St. Moritz Games:
 
 
 
 
 
 
 
 
 
 
 

(*) NOTE: Only counts players who participated in at least one game. Not all reserve players are known.

Final tournament
Defending champion Canada, which outscored its opponents 132–3 in the previous competition, was granted a bye to the medal round, after officials realised how superior they were to all of the other teams. The other 10 teams were placed in three groups for the first round.

First round

Group A
The top team (highlighted) advanced to the medal round.

Group B
The top team (highlighted) advanced to the medal round.

Group C
The top team (highlighted) advanced to the medal round.

Final round
The top teams from each of the three groups were joined by defending champion Canada in the medal round, playing a 3-game round-robin to determine the medal winners.

The match between Canada and Sweden was refereed by Paul Loicq, president of the International Ice Hockey Federation.

Statistics

Average age
Team Hungary was the oldest team in the tournament, averaging 31 years and 6 months. Team Belgium was the youngest team in the tournament, averaging 21 years and 6 months. Gold medalists Canada averaged 24 years and 10 months. Tournament average was 26 years and 9 months.

Top scorer

Final ranking

The IIHF Guide and Record Book has two different rankings for this tournament. The IOC, however, does not rank the teams below 4th

European Championship medal table

References

Sources
 
 1928 Olympic Games report (digitized copy online)
 International Olympic Committee results database

 
1928 Winter Olympics events
Olympics, Winter
1928
1928
1928
Oly